Charleston Navy Yard Officers' Quarters Historic District is a national historic district located at the former Charleston Naval Shipyard in North Charleston, South Carolina.  It encompasses 24 contributing buildings, 2 contributing sites, 1 contributing structure, and 1 contributing object.  The site represents development of the upper echelon of senior military housing, support structures, sports facilities and recreational landscape features from 1901 through 1945. The buildings reflect late Victorian and early-20th century eclectic designs including the Italianate, Neo-Classical, Italian Renaissance Revival, Colonial Revival, and the Works Progress Administration (WPA) designed Panama House style.

The oldest building on the base are Quarters F, a Victorian house that predates the Navy base and was built as the superintendent's house for the earlier Chicora Park (that the Navy acquired and converted into the base).

It was added to the National Register of Historic Places in 2007.

See also
 Naval Health Clinic Charleston

References

Works Progress Administration in South Carolina
Historic districts on the National Register of Historic Places in South Carolina
Houses on the National Register of Historic Places in South Carolina
Military facilities on the National Register of Historic Places in South Carolina
Buildings and structures in North Charleston, South Carolina
National Register of Historic Places in North Charleston, South Carolina
Houses in Charleston County, South Carolina